The 1987 Holly Farms 400 was a NASCAR Winston Cup Series racing event that was held on October 4, 1987, at North Wilkesboro Speedway in North Wilkesboro, North Carolina.

The most dominant drivers in the NASCAR Winston Cup Series during the 1980s were Bill Elliott, Darrell Waltrip, Terry Labonte, Bobby Allison, and Dale Earnhardt.

Background
During the 1980s, North Wilkesboro Speedway was noticeably lagging behind other speedways on the NASCAR circuit, but the fans were more interested in the great racing action between the legendary drivers. Enoch's focus was more on the fans' enjoyment rather than on building large suites and new facilities. Attendance and total purse for races at the track were the lowest in NASCAR, but the events continued to sell out and attract more fans each year.

In the 1981 Northwestern Bank 400, Dave Marcis, driving an unpainted car, won the pole with a lap record of 19.483 sec / 115.485 mph on the newly repaved track. The lap was 0.241 seconds faster than the previous record set by Dale Earnhardt one year earlier. A 22-year-old newcomer, Mark Martin, made his NASCAR Cup Series debut with a quick qualifying run, starting fifth. But he ended up dropping out 166 laps into the race with rear end problems and finished 27th. Bobby Allison was up front, leading the most laps with 186. Marcis stayed up front and led 123 laps but fell off the pace late in the race when his tires wore out. Richard Petty took the lead and led the final 62 laps for his 194th career win. This was Petty's 15th and final win at North Wilkesboro, the most Cup wins at the track. It was also Petty's 107th and final win on a short track. The top five finishers behind Petty were Allison, Darrell Waltrip, Marcis, and Harry Gant.

Darrell Waltrip dominated the Holly Farms 400 of 1981. He started on the pole, leading 318. He lapped the field on the way to the win, beginning a streak of five straight wins at the track. Bobby Allison finished second, one lap down after leading 76 laps. Other leaders in the race were Jody Ridley leading four laps, Dave Marcis with one lap, and Richard Petty with one.

The Northwestern Bank 400 of 1982 was ESPN's first broadcast at North Wilkesboro Speedway. Bob Jenkins and Ned Jarrett called the race, with Ron Kendrick as the pit reporter. They broadcast every North Wilkesboro race afterward until the final race there in the fall of 1996. Bobby Hillin Jr., at 17 years old, made his first career start and set the record for the youngest driver (A 1998 rule change raised the minimum age in NASCAR to 18, meaning this record is unlikely to be broken) to start a NASCAR Winston Cup race. Darrell Waltrip won the race from the pole, leading 345 laps.

The 1982 Holly Farms 400 was a total domination by Darrell Waltrip and the Junior Johnson team. Waltrip started the weekend by gaining his third straight pole at the track with a qualifying lap of 19.761 sec / 113.860 mph. He led 329 laps in the race. Bobby Allison was the only driver who could stay close to the No. 11 team. As the only other leader in the race, Allison led 71 laps but was forced out by engine problems after 141 laps. Only Waltrip and Harry Gant finished the race on the lead lap. It was Waltrip's third straight NASCAR Cup Series win at North Wilkesboro.

In the spring of 1983, NASCAR ran its first Busch race at North Wilkesboro. Tommy Ellis won the pole with a qualifying speed of 116.692 mph. Ellis led the first 15 laps before being passed by Butch Lindley. Sam Ard got the lead from Lindley on Lap 34 and led the rest of the 200-lap race. Only ten of the 23 cars finished the race. That fall, Phil Parsons won the pole for the second Busch race. Jack Ingram led a race-high 126 laps, but Tommy Ellis took the win. Only one event was held in 1984, with Sam Ard winning his final Busch race. Tommy Houston won the pole in 1985 for the last Busch race, with Jack Ingram taking the win.

Darrell Waltrip and Junior Johnson enjoyed a big win in the 1983 Holly Farms 400. It was Waltrip's fifth straight win at the track and Johnson's 100th career NASCAR Cup Series win as an owner, which just happened to take place at his home track within ten miles of his home and farm. Waltrip got the pole and led 252 laps on the way to victory. Dale Earnhardt was runner-up in the race with 134 laps out front.

The Northwestern Bank 400 of 1984 was dominated by Ricky Rudd, who got the pole and led 290 laps. But at the end of the race, Tim Richmond had a better pit stop to beat Ricky Rudd out of the win. Richmond's victory broke Darrell Waltrip's five-race winning streak at North Wilkesboro.

In the 1986 First Union 400, Geoffrey Bodine started on the pole. On Lap 85, Trevor Boys crashed out of the race and blocked the entrance to Pit Road, but no caution flag was thrown. Instead, a wrecker was sent out on the bottom of the track to haul Boys out of the way under green-flag conditions. Dale Earnhardt won the race and led 195 laps, followed by Ricky Rudd in second place with 102.

Race report
Exactly 6% of this race was run under caution; with the stretch of green flag laps lasting an average of 94 laps. A star-studded cast of crew chiefs were on hand for this race; with the most notable being Kirk Shelmerdine, Tim Brewer, Larry McReynolds, Dale Inman, Andy Petree and Joey Arrington.

In this 400-lap event, Bill Elliott and Dave Marcis dominated the first 100 laps while Terry Labonte managed to dominate most of the race. Two Canadian drivers were in this 32-car grid - Trevor Boys and Larry Pollard. Slick Johnson would end up finishing in last-place due to a problem with his stock car engine on lap 11. Terry Labonte would end up beating Dale Earnhardt under a caution flag after two hours and thirty-six minutes of racing; marking his seventh Winston Cup victory overall but his first on a short track. He go on to win four times here at North Wilkesboro before it dropped off the schedule. Chevrolet and Ford vehicles would play a huge role in determining the starting lineup.

Bill Elliott's Coors/Melling team showed improvement with their short track program from 1985 by sweeping the poles for the two North Wilkesboro races in 1987, & then winning the spring Bristol race in 1988 en route to the 1988 Winston Cup championship. This race was also Larry Pollard's last career NASCAR Winston Cup Series start. Four races, all of which were in 1987, saw him have no top fives, no top tens, no wins and no pole awards. He had and average starting position of 29.2 and an average finish of 19.8, with a best finish of 13th at Richmond in September. He competed in the #12 for Roger Hamby in Chevrolet and Oldsmobile. 

Davey Allison would become the lowest-finishing driver to complete the event; he and the Ranier team mostly skipped the short track races in 1987 but chose to enter the #28 Havoline Ford in this one just to get short track experience before running a full schedule in 1988. The team treated the event as a de facto test session, bringing the #28 T-Bird behind the wall on purpose a few times to make major adjustments (like changing all the springs) before sending Davey back out to get more experience. Hut Stricklin would be involved in a crash on lap 207 that knocked him out of the race. Drivers who failed to make the grid were Glenn Moffat, Lynn Gibson, J.D. McDuffie (#70), Bobby Gerhart, Kevin Evans (#54), Joe Dan Bailey (#36), D. Wayne Strout (#97), Ronnie Adams (#38), Bill Hollar, Graham Taylor, Brandon Baker (#88), Clark James and Rodney Combs.

Individual race earnings for each driver ranged from the winner's share of $45,575 ($ when adjusted for inflation) to the last-place finisher's share of $1,125 ($ when adjusted for inflation). The total prize purse for this event was $247,620 ($ when adjusted for inflation).

Qualifying

Top 10 finishers

Timeline
Section reference: 
 Start of race: Bill Elliot has the pole position.
 Lap 11: Slick Johnson develops an engine problem.
 Lap 24: The differential on Harry Gant's vehicle becomes problematic.
 Lap 39: First caution of the event, ended on lap 44.
 Lap 40: Dave Marcis took over the lead from Bill Elliott.
 Lap 46: Dale Earnhardt took over the lead from Dave Marcis.
 Lap 179: Geoffrey Bodine took over the lead from Dale Earnhardt.
 Lap 190: Dale Earnhardt took over the lead from Geoffrey Bodine.
 Lap 192: Second caution of the event, ended on lap 197.
 Lap 194: Terry Labonte took over the lead from Dale Earnhardt.
 Lap 198: Dave Marcis' engine gave up.
 Lap 202: Steve Christman's engine stopped working, forcing him to leave the race.
 Lap 207: Hut Stricklin had a terminal crash, ending his day on the track.
 Lap 208: Third caution of the event, ended on lap 218.
 Lap 265: Buddy Arrington's engine became faulty.
 Lap 400: Fourth caution of the event, which ended the race on a yellow flag.
 Finish: Terry Labonte wins the race.

Standings after the race

References

Holly Farms 400
Holly Farms 400
NASCAR races at North Wilkesboro Speedway